Michelle Cristeen Lesco (born September 16, 1983) is an American competitive eater. She is the 2021 women's champion in the Nathan's Hot Dog Eating Contest, with 30.75 hot dogs and buns consumed in 10 minutes on July 4, 2021, ending Miki Sudo's 7-year reign.

Early life
Lesco graduated from Eastern Arizona College in 2003 with an Associate of Arts in General Studies, graduated from University of Arizona in 2012 with a Bachelor of Arts in Psychology with minors in history and sociology, and received her teacher certification from Pima Community College in 2014.

Career
Lesco finished in second to Miki Sudo in the 2017, 2018, and 2019 Nathan's Hot Dog Eating Contests before winning in 2021. She is the third woman to win the Pink Mustard Belt since the contest was started in 2011. 

Lesco has also competed in other events, including eating 10.5 pounds of boysenberry pie and 158 chicken wings in 10 minutes. In 2016, she won the Turkish Airlines World Oyster Eating Championship by consuming 227 oysters in three minutes, defeating a ten-time champion.

Her nickname is "Cardboard Shell".

Lesco is a math teacher at Roberts Naylor k-8 School in Tucson. She has been teaching since 2012.

Nathan's Famous Hot Dog Eating Contest results

Humanitarian Work
Lesco was named Major League Eating's Humanitarian of the Year, working as the senior manager of Youth Services at the Volunteer Center of Southern Arizona, and donating both time and money to clean water initiatives in the Central African Republic's Bakota Liberté Village and Ethiopia's Adi Atsgeba Village and Adikokob Elementary School as well as the village of Geremu in Malawi.

References

Living people
1983 births
American competitive eaters